Rodgers and Hammerstein's Cinderella is a musical written for television, but later played on stage, with music by Richard Rodgers and a book and lyrics by Oscar Hammerstein II.  It is based upon the fairy tale Cinderella, particularly the French version Cendrillon, ou la petite pantoufle de verre ("Cinderella, or The Little Glass Slipper"), by Charles Perrault. The story concerns a young woman forced into a life of servitude by her cruel stepmother and self-centered stepsisters, who dreams of a better life. With the help of her fairy godmother, Cinderella is transformed into a princess and finds her prince.

Cinderella is the only Rodgers and Hammerstein musical written for television. It was originally broadcast live in color on CBS on March 31, 1957, as a vehicle for Julie Andrews, who played the title role. The broadcast was viewed by more than 100 million people. It was subsequently remade for television twice, in 1965 and 1997. The 1965 version starred Lesley Ann Warren and Stuart Damon. The 1997 version starred Brandy Norwood in the title role, with Whitney Houston as the fairy godmother. Both remakes add songs from other Richard Rodgers musicals.

The musical has been adapted for the stage in a number of versions, including a London West End pantomime adaptation, a New York City Opera production that follows the original television version closely, and various touring productions. A 2013 adaptation on Broadway starred Laura Osnes and Santino Fontana, with a new book by Douglas Carter Beane.

History
In the 1950s, television adaptations of musicals were fairly common. Broadcast versions of Annie Get Your Gun, Wonderful Town, Anything Goes and Kiss Me, Kate were all seen during the decade. In 1955, NBC had broadcast the Broadway musical Peter Pan, starring Mary Martin. It was a hit, and the network looked for more family-oriented musical projects. Richard Rodgers had previously supplied the Emmy Award-winning score for Victory at Sea, a documentary series about World War II. NBC approached Rodgers and Hammerstein and asked them to write an original musical expressly for television (rather than merely adapting an existing one to the television special format), then a novel idea. The team decided to adapt the fairy tale Cinderella and, new to television, they sought the advice of an industry insider, Richard Lewine. Lewine was then the Vice President in charge of color television at CBS and a cousin of Richard Rodgers. He told Rodgers and Hammerstein that CBS was also seeking a musical project and had already signed Julie Andrews, who was then starring in My Fair Lady on Broadway. Rodgers recalled, in his autobiography: "What sold us immediately was the chance to work with Julie." Rodgers and Hammerstein signed with CBS.

Rodgers and Hammerstein retained ownership of the show and had control over casting, direction, set and costumes, while CBS controlled the technical aspects of the broadcast and had an option for a second broadcast. CBS announced the production on September 5, 1956. In adapting the famous fairy tale, "Rodgers and Hammerstein stayed faithful to the original Charles Perrault" version.  Hammerstein was interviewed by the Saturday Review about the adaptation: "We want the kids who see it to recognize the story they know. Children can be very critical on that score. But, of course, their parents will be watching too, so we have tried to humanize the characters without altering the familiar plot structure." The musical had to fit into the 90-minute program with six commercial breaks, so it was divided into six short acts. In an interview with Time magazine, Hammerstein said that "It took me seven months to write the book and lyrics for Cinderella".

Rehearsals started on February 21, 1957. Emmy Award-winning director Ralph Nelson and choreographer Jonathan Lucas, who had choreographed for The Milton Berle Show, were both experienced with musical material on television. Rodgers' friend, Robert Russell Bennett, provided the orchestrations. Alfredo Antonini, a veteran with CBS, conducted. In early March, the company moved to CBS Television Color Studio 72, the first CBS-TV color studio in New York and the smallest color studio in the CBS empire at the time. The 56 performers, 33 musicians and 80 stagehands and crew worked crammed into the small studio together with four giant RCA TK-40A color TV cameras, a wardrobe of up to 100 costumes, over half a dozen huge set pieces, and numerous props and special effects equipment. The orchestra played in a small room with special equipment to overcome the suppressed acoustics. CBS invested in a massive marketing campaign, as did the sponsors. Ed Sullivan also promoted the show, which would be seen in his usual Sunday night time slot, with an appearance by Richard Rodgers and Oscar Hammerstein II on the previous Sunday.

Synopsis

Act I
In the village square, the Town Crier proclaims: "The Prince Is Giving a Ball" to celebrate Prince Christopher's 21st birthday. The ladies of the kingdom are thrilled at the prospect of meeting him. Cinderella, whose father has died, takes care of the home of her ill-tempered and selfish stepmother and two stepsisters. She carries all of their shopping parcels for them, and when they return home, all three order Cinderella about. Left alone in her corner near the fire, she dreams of living an exotic life as a princess or anything other than a servant ("In My Own Little Corner"). Meanwhile, the King and Queen get ready for the big celebration ("Royal Dressing Room Scene") and the servants discuss the planning for the feast ("Your Majesties"). They hope that their son will find a suitable bride, but the Prince is a bit apprehensive about meeting all the eager women of the kingdom. The Queen is touched by overhearing the King's discussion with his son and tells him she loves him ("Boys and Girls Like You and Me" [sometimes omitted, not sung in any of the telecasts]).

As Cinderella's stepsisters get ready for the Ball, hoping that they will catch the Prince's eye, they laugh at Cinderella's dreams. After they leave Cinderella imagines having gone with them ("In My Own Little Corner" (reprise)). Cinderella's Fairy Godmother appears and is moved by Cinderella's wish to go to the Ball. She transforms Cinderella into a beautifully gowned young lady and her little mouse friends and a pumpkin into a glittering carriage with footmen ("Impossible; It's Possible"); Cinderella leaves for the Ball.

Act II
Cinderella arrives at the palace at 11:30; before she enters, her Godmother warns her not to stay past midnight. The Prince is bored by the attention of all the young ladies with whom he has had to dance, including the stepsisters. Cinderella's grand entrance immediately attracts everyone's attention and intrigues the Prince. They dance together and instantly fall in love ("Ten Minutes Ago"). Seeing the Prince with a beauty whom they do not recognize, the stepsisters ask why he wouldn't prefer a "usual" girl like them ("Stepsisters' Lament"). As the Prince and Cinderella dance he declares his love for her ("Do I Love You Because You're Beautiful?"). As they embrace, the clock strikes midnight and Cinderella flees before the magic wears off, but in her haste she leaves behind a glass slipper.

Act III
The next morning, Cinderella's stepmother and stepsisters reminisce about the Ball and find that Cinderella is very intuitive about what it must have been like going to the Ball ("When You're Driving Through the Moonlight") and dancing with the Prince ("A Lovely Night"). Meanwhile, the Prince is searching for the woman with whom he danced and who fled so quickly from the Ball. One of the royal guards tries the slipper on all the women of the kingdom ("The Search"). At Cinderella's house, the slipper will not fit any of the ladies. Cinderella's stepmother tries to steer the guard away from Cinderella, but she is not home; she is hiding in the Palace garden. The guard returns to the palace garden and informs the Prince that he has not found the missing girl. The guard then sees Cinderella hiding and places her under arrest. Prodded by the Fairy Godmother, he tries the slipper on Cinderella. It fits, and the Prince is called back to the garden where he recognizes his beloved ("Do I Love You Because You're Beautiful?" (reprise)). Cinderella and the Prince marry.

Musical numbers
The original version contains the following songs:

 Act I
 "Overture" – Orchestra
 "The Prince Is Giving a Ball" – Town Crier and Chorus
 "Cinderella March" – Orchestra
 "In My Own Little Corner" – Cinderella
 "The Prince Is Giving a Ball" (reprise) – Chorus
 "Your Majesties" (Royal Dressing Room Scene) – King, Queen, Chef and Steward
 "In My Own Little Corner" (reprise) – Cinderella
 "Impossible; It's Possible" – Cinderella and Fairy Godmother

 Act II
 "Gavotte" – Orchestra
 "Ten Minutes Ago" – Prince and Cinderella
 "Stepsisters' Lament" – Stepsisters
 "Waltz for a Ball" – Chorus
 "Do I Love You Because You're Beautiful?" – Prince and Cinderella
 "Never in a Thousand Years" (eventually omitted from the production)

 Act III
 "When You're Driving Through the Moonlight" – Cinderella, Stepmother and Stepsisters
 "A Lovely Night" – Cinderella, Stepmother and Stepsisters
 "The Search" – Orchestra
 "Do I Love You Because You're Beautiful?" (Reprise) – Prince
 "Wedding" – Orchestra
 "Do I Love You Because You're Beautiful?" (Reprise) – Chorus

In some productions, additional numbers added include "Loneliness of Evening" (cut from South Pacific and introduced in the 1965 broadcast), a song for the prince; and "Boys and Girls like You and Me" (cut from Oklahoma! and subsequently other shows), for the queen and king (in the Royal Dressing Room Scene), which appears in the show's published vocal score. The 1997 TV adaptation added "Falling in Love with Love" for the Stepmother, "The Sweetest Sounds" for Cinderella and the Prince, and "There's Music in You" (written for Main Street to Broadway), for the Fairy Godmother. The 2013 Broadway production was performed in two acts and included the songs "Me, Who Am I?" (cut from Me & Juliet), "Loneliness of Evening" and "Now Is the Time" (cut from South Pacific), "The Pursuit", and "There's Music in You".

Television productions

1957 original production
The original 1957 broadcast was directed by Nelson with choreography by Lucas and musical direction by Antonini. It starred Andrews in the title role and Jon Cypher as The Prince. It also featured Howard Lindsay as The King, Dorothy Stickney as The Queen, Edie Adams as the Fairy Godmother, Kaye Ballard and Alice Ghostley as stepsisters Portia and Joy, Ilka Chase as the Stepmother, and Iggie Wolfington as The Steward. Joe Layton appeared uncredited in the ensemble.

On March 31, 1957, at 8:00 pm Eastern time, Cinderella was broadcast live in the Eastern, Central and Mountain time zones in both black and white and compatible color; the West Coast received a delayed black and white-only broadcast starting at 8:00 pm Pacific time. Beyond the United States, it was carried by CBS affiliates in the U.S. territories of Alaska, Hawaii and Puerto Rico; in Canada it was broadcast on CBC. It was produced for $376,000 and was heavily promoted by its sponsors, Pepsi-Cola and the Shulton Company (then maker of Old Spice). The Nielsen TV rating for the program was 18,864,000 "homes reached during an average minute" of the broadcast. More than 107 million viewers saw the broadcast, and Andrews was nominated for an Emmy Award for her performance. One of the four color TV cameras failed during the live telecast, adding to the production's technical difficulties.

A black and white kinescope of the March 17, 1957, dress rehearsal survives and has been issued on DVD. There is no evidence that Cinderella was recorded on videotape, which CBS used at that time only to time-delay news programming for the stations on the West Coast. The equipment was not yet capable of recording color video.

1965 version

After the musical's success in London and elsewhere as a stage production, the network decided to produce another television version. The 1957 premiere had been broadcast before color videotape was available, so only one performance could be shown. CBS mounted a new production in 1965, with Richard Rodgers as Executive Producer and written by Joseph Schrank. The new script hewed closer to the traditional tale, although nearly all of the original songs were retained and sung in their original settings. A new sequence opens the story: the Prince stops at Cinderella's house with his retinue for a drink of water after returning from his travels. Cinderella, home alone, and not knowing who the handsome traveler is until a page utters the words "Your Highness", kindly gives the Prince water from the well. After the Prince leaves, he sings "Loneliness of Evening", which had been composed for South Pacific in 1949 but not used in that musical. Cinderella sings "In My Own Little Corner" before there is any mention of the prince giving a ball. The names of the stepsisters were changed from the original production, and the Royal Dressing Room Scene was omitted.

The 1965 version was directed by Charles S. Dubin with choreography by Eugene Loring and recorded on videotape (at CBS Television City in Hollywood) for later broadcast. The cast featured Ginger Rogers and Walter Pidgeon as the Queen and King; Celeste Holm as the Fairy Godmother; Jo Van Fleet as the Stepmother, with Pat Carroll and Barbara Ruick as her daughters Prunella and Esmerelda; and Stuart Damon as the Prince. Lesley Ann Warren, at age 18, played the title role. The film also features rare on camera appearances by dubbers Betty Noyes and Bill Lee, who play a couple that briefly sing about their daughter (played by Trudi Ames). The first broadcast was on February 22, 1965, and it was rebroadcast eight times through February 1974. The 1965 debut had a Nielsen rating of 42.3, making it the highest-rated non-sports special on CBS from the beginning of the Nielsen ratings until 2009, and the 50th highest-rated show of any kind during that period.

1997 version
 
The 1997 television remake was adapted by Robert L. Freedman and directed by Robert Iscove, with choreography by Rob Marshall. It was produced by Whitney Houston and Debra Martin Chase for Walt Disney Television and aired on November 2, 1997. This version featured a racially diverse cast, with Brandy Norwood as Cinderella, Whitney Houston as Cinderella's fairy godmother, Bernadette Peters as Cinderella's stepmother, Paolo Montalbán as the prince, Whoopi Goldberg as the queen, Victor Garber as the king and Jason Alexander as Lionel, the herald. Several songs were added, including "Falling in Love with Love" from the musical The Boys from Syracuse, sung by the Stepmother; "The Sweetest Sounds" from the musical No Strings, sung by Cinderella and the Prince; and "There's Music in You", written for the 1953 film Main Street to Broadway, sung as the finale by the Fairy Godmother. Sixty million viewers watched the broadcast.

Changes to the Hammerstein plot in this version include the following: The Fairy Godmother begins the story, explaining that nothing is impossible. The stepsisters' names are changed to Calliope and Minerva. Disguised as a peasant, the Prince (feeling isolated in the castle) wanders in the marketplace (worrying his herald, Lionel), meets Cinderella, and they find each other charming. At the ball, embarrassed by questions about her family and background, Cinderella escapes to the garden in tears, where the Fairy Godmother appears for moral support. After her stepmother returns from the ball and is particularly cruel, Cinderella packs her belongings to run away from home. Her Fairy Godmother advises her to share her feelings with the Prince. After trying the slipper on all the other maidens, the Prince and Lionel overtake Cinderella on her journey to freedom. Meeting her gaze, the Prince recognizes her and places the slipper on her foot. At their wedding, the Fairy Godmother blesses the couple.

Stage productions

1958 to 2008
The musical was first performed on stage at the London Coliseum in 1958 in holiday pantomime adaptation that also used songs from Me & Juliet. Harold Fielding produced this version, which opened on December 18, 1958, and played through the holiday season. Yana (Pamella Guard), played Cinderella, with Tommy Steele, Jimmy Edwards, Kenneth Williams and Betty Marsden.

Stage versions began to appear in U.S. theaters by 1961. The Los Angeles Civic Light Opera produced the show in 1990 featuring Steve Allen, Jayne Meadows, and Rose-Marie. The New York City Opera produced the musical in 1993 and 1995 with Sally Ann Howes as The Fairy Godmother, Crista Moore as Cinderella, George Dvorsky as The Prince, Nancy Marchand (1993) and Jean Stapleton (1995) as The Stepmother, George S. Irving as The King and Jane Powell as The Queen. It revived the production in 2004 with Eartha Kitt as The Fairy Godmother, Sarah Uriarte Berry as Cinderella, Christopher Sieber as The Prince, John "Lypsinka" Epperson as The Stepmother, Dick Van Patten as The King, Renée Taylor as The Queen, Lea DeLaria as Joy and Ana Gasteyer as Portia.  A United States tour played from November 2000 through 2001 and starred Kitt as the Fairy Godmother, Deborah Gibson and later Jamie-Lynn Sigler and Jessica Rush as Cinderella, Paolo Montalbán as the Prince, and a gender-bending Everett Quinton as the Stepmother, stopping at the Theater at Madison Square Garden in 2001, where Sigler played the title role.

A 30-week Asian tour of Cinderella starred Lea Salonga and Australian Peter Saide. The production was directed by Bobby Garcia, with choreography by Vince Pesce.  Costume design was by Renato Balestra, with sets by David Gallo. The tour started in Manila, Philippines, on July 29, 2008. The show then went on to several cities in China, including Xian, Zhengzhou, Chongqing, Shenzhen, Gunagzhou, Shanghai, Beijing and Hong Kong.  It then toured in Thailand, Singapore, Malaysia, Korea, and Japan. A cast album was issued in 2008.

An all-female production of the musical in Japan in 2008 featured J-Pop group Morning Musume and veteran members of the Takarazuka Revue. The production ran throughout August 2008, at Shinjuku Koma Theater in Tokyo. The lead roles of Cinderella and the Prince were performed by Morning Musume members Ai Takahashi and Risa Niigaki.

Broadway

Douglas Carter Beane wrote a new book for the musical's first Broadway production. In his plot, Cinderella opens Prince Topher's eyes to the injustice in the kingdom. The prince's parents have died, leaving the kingdom in the hands of a villainous minister who has been the prince's mentor and has duped his young charge into approving oppressive legislation. The rebel Jean-Michel, a new character, and stepsister Gabrielle are in love and seek to overthrow the government. The score includes the best-known songs from the original version and four more songs from the Rodgers and Hammerstein catalogue.

The show, produced by Robyn Goodman, began previews on Broadway on January 25 and officially opened on March 3, 2013, at the Broadway Theatre. Mark Brokaw directed the production, with Josh Rhodes choreographing, and the cast included Laura Osnes in the title role, Santino Fontana as the Prince, Victoria Clark as crazy Marie/the Fairy Godmother, Harriet Harris as Ella's stepmother, Peter Bartlett as the Prime Minister, Ann Harada and Marla Mindelle as stepsisters Charlotte and Gabrielle, and Greg Hildreth as Jean-Michel. Designers included Anna Louizos (sets), William Ivey Long (costumes) and Kenneth Posner (lighting). The production was nominated for nine Tony Awards, winning one for Long's costume design. Reviews were mixed, with most critics praising Osnes's performance.

Keke Palmer was a replacement in the title role. A report in The Guardian commented that "casting an African American actor as such an iconic – and typically pale – character is emblematic of the progress Broadway is making, slowly and haltingly, in employing actors of color in a broader array of parts." In September 2014, Lesley Ann Warren joined the cast during the curtain call to celebrate the 50th anniversary release of her 1965 television version. The production closed on Broadway on January 3, 2015, after 41 previews and 770 regular performances. National tours and international productions have followed.

Reception
The 1957 version of Cinderella was seen by the largest audience in history at the time of its premiere: 107,000,000 people in the US: fully 60% of the country's population at that time.   Variety estimated that 24.2 million households were tuned into the show, with an average of 4.43 viewers each. Jon Cypher later remembered leaving the studio a few minutes after the broadcast had ended and finding the Manhattan streets deserted because so many had stayed in to watch the broadcast.

A review in The New York Times by Jack Gould characterized the musical as "a pleasant Cinderella that lacked the magic touch." He wrote that the broadcast received an "extraordinary range of reactions; it was either unreservedly enjoyed, rather angrily rejected or generally approved, subject to significant reservations."  He praised Andrews as a "beguiling vision" in "lovely color video". But he complained about the book ("What possessed Mr. Hammerstein to turn the stepsisters into distasteful vaudeville clowns?"); about errors in "the most elementary kind of showmanship;" about costume ("couldn't Cinderella have been dressed in a dreamlike ball gown of fantasy rather than a chic, form-fitting number?"); and the staging ("cramped ... excellent depth, but limited width marred the ballroom scene"). He judged the songs "not top-drawer Rodgers and Hammerstein" and "reminiscent and derivative of some of their earlier successes" but praised four of them and said: "In television, where original music is virtually nonexistent, these add up to quite a treat ... some current [Broadway] musicals cannot boast as much melodically."

The 1965 version was broadcast repeatedly.  The 1997 production was the number one show of the week, with over 60 million viewers. It became the highest-rated TV musical in a generation. Although it was a hit with audiences, it received mixed reviews. Theater historian John Kenrick called it a "clumsy remake" of the musical but commented that Bernadette Peters' "shtick trying on the glass slipper is hilarious". The New York Times praised the performers (Montalban has "an old-fashioned luxurious voice"; Jason Alexander "provides comic relief"; Goldberg "winningly blends royal dignity with motherly meddling"; Peters "brings vigor and sly comedy") but commented that the musical "was always a pumpkin that never turned into a glittering coach ... the songs are lesser Rodgers and Hammerstein ... it doesn't take that final leap into pure magic. Often charming and sometimes ordinary, this is a cobbled-together Cinderella for the moment, not the ages." Other critics, however, praised the presentation. One reviewer wrote: "Grade: A, a version both timely and timeless." Another agreed: "this version has much to recommend it." An encore broadcast on Valentine's Night 1998 drew another 15,000,000 viewers.

Reviews for the Broadway version were mixed. Ben Brantley of The New York Times called the 2013 Broadway production a "glittery patchwork of a show" that "wants to be reassuringly old-fashioned and refreshingly irreverent, sentimental and snarky, sincere and ironic, all at once." Brantley felt that the show "doesn't seem to know quite what" it wants to be. The Financial Times praised the cast, especially Osnes, the costumes and the choreography and opined that "the production is an absolute joy, marred only by occasional slowness of pace." Richard Zoglin, writing for Time magazine, noted that the new production is "brightly colored, high spirited and well sung", but compared it unfavorably with the "emotionally alive" 1957 broadcast.  A reviewer from the Chicago Tribune wrote: "The fundamental problem with ... Beane's perplexing, wholly unromantic and mostly laugh-free new book ... is that it denies the audience the pleasure of instant reversals of fortune. ... This new version ends up collapsing the basic logic of the familiar story and tramples all over the musical soul of a score from another era". On the other hand, the reviewer from USA Today liked the production, commenting that "Osnes and a gifted supporting cast make this fairy tale very much their own – a scrumptious trifle that, for all its hokey moments, will charm theatergoers of all ages." An Associated Press review praised Beane's script and wrote that it "crackles with sweetness and freshness, combining a little "Monty Python's Spamalot" with some "Les Misérables". It also found the cast "first-rate" and the overall story "quirky, yet heart filled".

Recordings
Columbia Records recorded the musical selections from the first telecast of Cinderella on March 18, 1957, nearly two weeks before the show aired, in monaural and stereophonic sound, releasing the mono version in 1957 and then the stereo version in 1958. The stereo version was later reissued on CD by Sony.  The black-and-white kinescope recording made during the telecast was broadcast on PBS in December 2004 as part of its Great Performances series.  It was later released on DVD with a documentary including most of its original players, as well as a kinescope of Rodgers and Hammerstein's appearance on The Ed Sullivan Show the preceding Sunday, featuring Hammerstein reciting one of the songs to orchestral accompaniment.

In 1959 RCA Victor released an abridged Cinderella with Mary Martin and The Little Orchestra Society, which was released on CD in 2010 (Sepia 1144). A cast LP album of the 1965 telecast was also issued by Columbia Masterworks Records and on a Sony Masterworks CD.  All three of the telecast versions of Cinderella have been released on DVD.  A cast recording of the 2013 Broadway production was issued by Ghostlight Records in 2013.

Awards and nominations

1957 TV Special

1997 TV Special

References

External links
Cinderella at Rodgers & Hammerstein Theatricals

Television versions

playbill article, Nov. 21, 2004 "The First "Cinderella" Returns
Curtain Up review, October 2005

Stage versions
 Official Broadway production website
 
 Sneak peek video of the Broadway cast at TheaterMania.com, January 2013
  (archive)
 Cinderella at Broadwaymusicalhome.com
 "Cinderella" at The Guide to Musical Theatre

1957 musicals
1957 television specials
1965 television specials
1997 television specials
American musical films
Broadway musicals
CBS television specials
American live television shows
Musicals based on novels
Musicals based on secular traditions
Musicals based on works by Charles Perrault
Musicals by Rodgers and Hammerstein
Musical television films
Musical television specials
Plays based on fairy tales
Television shows based on fairy tales
West End musicals
Works based on Cinderella